Stefán Jón Hafstein (born February 18, 1955) is an employee of the Ministry for Foreign Affairs in Iceland, formerly ambassador to the UN Rome based agencies, FAO, WFP and IFAD. In 2022 he is a Special Envoy for Ocean Affairs at the Ministry.  He was previously with the Icelandic International Development Agency (ICEIDA) since 2007. He was the country director in Malawi from 2008 to 2012, but previously a project manager in Namibia. Since 2015 he has been the country director in Uganda. He has a career as a politician, journalist and author. He founded a daily magazine programme for Rás 2 and directed radio episodes for the programmes Meinhorn ('curmudgeon') and Þjóðarsálin ('national character'), in which listeners had an opportunity to call in and comment on various topics. He was the editor of the national daily newspaper Dagur (Dagur-Timinn) 1997-1999.

Stefán was elected City Councillor for the Reykjavíkurlistinn 2002, and the Social Democrats in 2005 but he received a leave of absence in the city council at the beginning of 2007 for two years to work as a project manager at the Development Bank of Iceland of Namibia. He was ICEIDA country director in Malawi 2008–2012, working for ICEIDA in the capital from 2012. His spouse is Guðrún Kristín Sigurðardóttir.

Life 

Stefán's parents were Hannes Þórður Hafstein and Sigrún Stefánsdóttir (both deceased). Stefán's primary school was Vogaskóli and he graduated in 1975 from Menntaskólinn við Tjörnina. He studied English and literature at the University of Iceland and obtained a BA degree in media studies from the Polytechnic of Central London in 1979.

Upon graduation Stefán returned home to Iceland and worked as a journalist and programmer at RÚV 1979–1982. He undertook postgraduate studies in communication studies at the University of Pennsylvania 1983–85 and graduated with a MA degree.

Upon graduating, he worked for a time as an ambassador for the Red Cross in Geneva and Ethiopia and held positions of responsibility in that capacity elsewhere. He served as program director of Rás 2, and as a programmer for Icelandic television and radio. He presented the question contest Gettu betur in 1991–1994. He was editor of the newspaper Dagur-Tíminn (later Dagur) from 1997 to 1999, with his own business in 2000 and served as head of new media and operations manager with the media and publishing company Edda 2001–2002.

Political career 

Stefán took part in the preparation and establishment of the Social Democrats in 1999 and 2000. He was elected Chairman of the Commission of Social Democrats from 2001 to 2005. He was elected as City Councillor in Reykjavik in 2002 for the Reykjavíkurlistinn, where he is a representative of the Social Democrats. He won first place in the list of the Social Democratic primaries in 2003. Has served as chairman of the city council, city council president, chairman of the education council, chairman of the Culture and Tourism Board and the chairman of the district Grafarvogur. He was chairman of Vikar Maritime Museum from 2004. He was a candidate for the city council in 2005 for the Social Democrats and was elected, sitting on the education board, culture and tourism board, and the board of Reykjavík Energy for a time.

Stefán Jón Hafstein got leave from work in the city council at the beginning of 2007 for two years to work as a project manager at the ICEIDA in Namibia and ceased his work in politics when he became ICEIDA country director in Malawi in 2008. He has worked on those matters since.

Books 

Stefán has published six books:

 Sagnaþulir samtímans, fjölmiðlar á öld upplýsinga (1987)
 Guðirnir eru geggjaðir, ferðasaga frá Afríku (1990)
 New York New York (1992)
 Fluguveiðisögur (2000) (see Flugur.is)
 Fluguveiðiráð (2013)
 Afríka – ást við aðra sýn (2014)
Heimurinn eins og hann er (2022)

References

External links 
Personal webpage

Stefan Jon Hafstein
Living people
Stefan Jon Hafstein
1955 births
Stefan Jon Hafstein